Meredith Howland (March 31, 1833 – April 4, 1912) was an American soldier and clubman who was prominent in New York society during the Gilded Age.

Early life
Howland was born in Flushing, Queens on March 31, 1833.  He was the son of Louisa Sophia (née Meredith) Howland (1810–1888) and Gardiner Greene Howland (1787–1851), a prominent merchant with the firm G.G. & S.S. Howland (which employed Moses Taylor as a clerk).  Among his siblings were Rebecca Brien Howland (first wife of James Roosevelt I) and Gardiner Greene Howland Jr.  From his father's first marriage to Louisa Edgar, he was the younger half-brother of William Edgar Howland, Abby Woolsey Howland, and the Rev. Robert Shaw Howland.

His paternal grandparents were Joseph Howland and Lydia (née Bill) Howland.  His maternal grandfather was Jonathan Meredith.  His first cousin was Union Army officer and New York State Treasurer Joseph Howland, the son of his uncle Samuel Shaw Howland, a co-founder of G.G. & S.S. Howland.  The first American Howland ancestor was John Howland, one of the Pilgrim Fathers and a signer of the 1620 Mayflower Compact, the governing document of what became Plymouth Colony.

Career
During the U.S. Civil War, Howland served as a paymaster under Colonel Marshall Lefferts in the Union Army's 7th New York Militia infantry regiment. The 7th Regiment was known as a "Silk Stocking" regiment due to the disproportionate number of its members who were part of New York City's social elite,

Society life
In 1892, Howland was included in Ward McAllister's "Four Hundred", purported to be an index of New York's best families, published in The New York Times.  Conveniently, 400 was the number of people that could fit into Mrs. Astor's ballroom.

Personal life
In 1870, Howland was married to Adelaide Torrance (1846–1932), the daughter of Daniel Torrance and Sophia Johnson (née Vanderbilt) Torrance. Adelaide's maternal grandfather was Commodore Cornelius Vanderbilt and her paternal grandfather was merchant John Torrance.  Among her siblings were Marie Torrance (who married John A. Hadden Jr.), and Alfred Torrance (who married Louise Post and then divorced so Louise could marry Frederick W. Vanderbilt).  The Howlands lived mostly in Paris and Cannes (at the Villa Dubosc), where his wife became known as a prominent hostess (befriending Marcel Proust) and "indefatigable bridgeplayer."

Howland, who did not have any children, died in Cannes, France on April 4, 1912, and was buried at Woodlawn Cemetery in the Bronx.  After his death, his wife remained in France, where she died in 1932.

References
Notes

Sources

External links
 

1833 births
1912 deaths
Military personnel from New York City
People of New York (state) in the American Civil War
People included in New York Society's Four Hundred
Burials at Woodlawn Cemetery (Bronx, New York)
Howland family